In the context of transit in New York, the Purple Line may refer to:

 The Belmont Park Branch of the Long Island Rail Road
 Services using the IRT Flushing Line of the New York City Subway
 The 7 train, which operates along the entire length of the Flushing Line
 The Pascack Valley Line of the Metro-North Railroad
 The Ronkonkoma Branch of the Long Island Rail Road